Bonnie Blair Brown (born April 23, 1946) is an American theater, film and television actress. She has had a number of high-profile roles, including in the play Copenhagen on Broadway, the leading actress in the films Altered States (1980), Continental Divide (1981) and Strapless (1989), as well as a run as the title character in the comedy-drama television series The Days and Nights of Molly Dodd, which ran from 1987 to 1991. Her later roles include Nina Sharp on the Fox television series Fringe and Judy King on the Netflix series Orange Is the New Black.

Early life
Brown was born in Washington, DC.  Her mother was a teacher and her father worked for the Central Intelligence Agency. She graduated from The Madeira School in McLean, Virginia, and then pursued acting at the National Theatre School of Canada, graduating in 1969. She gained notice as a participating actor at the Stratford Shakespeare Festival and spent several years working on the stage.

Career

Film
Brown's first feature role was in the Oscar-winning 1973 film The Paper Chase; her first major starring role was in The Choirboys in 1977. Among her other film credits were Altered States (opposite William Hurt), One Trick Pony (with Paul Simon), the film Stealing Home (opposite Mark Harmon) and A Flash of Green (1984). Her arguably highest profile film role to date was the romantic lead opposite John Belushi in Continental Divide (1981) for which she received her first Golden Globe Award nomination, in the category of Best Motion Picture Actress in a Comedy/Musical.

Other film roles include: And I Alone Survived (1978), Strapless (1989), The Astronaut's Wife (1999), Clint Eastwood's Space Cowboys (2000), Lars von Trier's Dogville, the Kevin Bacon-directed Loverboy (2005) and  The Sentinel (2006).

Television
Brown appeared in several television movies and miniseries, primarily during the 1980s. A high-profile role as Jacqueline Kennedy in the 1983 TV miniseries Kennedy earned her a second Golden Globe nomination, for Best Actress in a Mini-Series or Motion Picture Made for Television, as well as a BAFTA nomination. She also appeared in several other programs about the Kennedys, including the 1996 miniseries A Season in Purgatory, which was a thinly veiled portrait of the family, as well as an appearance as Anna Roosevelt in a telefilm about Franklin Delano Roosevelt and Eleanor Roosevelt.

Brown's visibility rose during her five-year run (1987–1991) on the comedy-drama series The Days and Nights of Molly Dodd. She played the title role, and she, and the show, earned a small but dedicated following. Brown received five consecutive Emmy Award nominations for each season, in the category of Outstanding Lead Actress in a Comedy Series, but never won. The show spent two years on NBC, then moved to the Lifetime cable channel for the remainder of its run.

Brown also appeared in other prime-time series including The Rockford Files, Kojak, Frasier, Smallville, Touched by an Angel, ER, and Ed. In 1975 she appeared in one episode of the television mini-series Wheels. Beginning in 2008, Brown starred as Nina Sharp in the Fox television series Fringe. Brown also appeared in several seasons of the Netflix comedy-drama series Orange is the New Black as fictional television personality Judy King, an inmate loosely based on Martha Stewart.

Stage
Brown has been involved with theater since the beginning of her career. She appeared in the 1975 New York Shakespeare Festival production of The Comedy of Errors. Among her earlier roles was a run as Lucy Brown in the 1976 production of The Threepenny Opera, produced by Joe Papp and directed by Richard Foreman. She left the production for film work, but after being away from the production for eight months, Ellen Greene, who was playing the part of Jenny, fell ill. Brown astounded the stage manager of the production by coming in and, with one hour of rehearsal, put on a "brilliant" performance as Jenny. Her first major appearance on Broadway came in 1989, in the play Secret Rapture, written by David Hare.

Once "Molly Dodd" concluded, Brown became a prolific Broadway actress, appearing in, among other productions, Tom Stoppard's 1995 Lincoln Center Theater production of Arcadia and two separate runs as Frau Schneider in the revival of Cabaret (1998 and 2003). She played Margrethe, the wife of physicist Niels Bohr, in the play Copenhagen, a role for which she won a 2000 Tony Award in the category of Best Featured Actress in a Play. Brown played the lead role in Sarah Ruhl's 2006 play The Clean House at Lincoln Center.

Voice
In the 1990s, Brown expanded her career into voiceover work, narrating both audiobooks and films and documentaries. Her audiobooks projects include John Grisham's The Client, Lois Lowry's Number the Stars, Stephen King's Rose Madder, Kevin Henkes' Olive's Ocean, Sue Miller's 2005 novel Lost in the Forest, and Isabel Allende's Inés of My Soul.

Her voiceovers are heard on a number of documentaries, including PBS's American Experience series and the 2007 PBS series The Mysterious Human Heart. Other documentary narrations include the scientific series The Secret Life of the Brain, a documentary on Aimee Semple McPherson, which aired in April 2007, and a 2006 PBS documentary about Marie Antoinette. In April, 2010, she co-narrated the PBS special The Buddha with Richard Gere.

Personal life
Brown had a relationship with actor Richard Jordan, whom she met while filming the miniseries Captains and the Kings in 1976. The couple lived together from 1976 to 1985; their son Robert Anson Jordan III was born in 1983. She dated playwright David Hare from 1985 to 1990; he referred to her as his muse. She mentioned on The Tonight Show in 1989 that she is a Democrat.

Filmography

Films

Television films

Television series

References

External links

 
 
 

1946 births
American film actresses
American stage actresses
American musical theatre actresses
American television actresses
Audiobook narrators
Actresses from Washington, D.C.
Living people
National Theatre School of Canada alumni
20th-century American actresses
21st-century American actresses
Madeira School alumni